Dorothea Gopie is a South African politician. She served as a Member of the Western Cape Provincial Parliament from May 2014 to May 2019. Gopie is a member of the African National Congress.

Western Cape Provincial Parliament
In 2014, Gopie was placed 12th on the African National Congress provincial list for that year's provincial election on 7 May 2014. The party won 14 seats in the election and Gopie was sworn in as a Member of the Western Cape Provincial Parliament on 21 May 2014.

She was not placed on the party's list for the 2019 election. On 7 May 2019, she left the provincial parliament.

Committees
Standing Committee on Premier (Alternate Member)
Standing Committee on Community Development

References

External links
Archived profile at Western Cape Provincial Parliament

Living people
Year of birth missing (living people)
Members of the Western Cape Provincial Parliament
African National Congress politicians
Coloured South African people
21st-century South African politicians
People from the Western Cape
Women members of provincial legislatures of South Africa